is a Japanese actor.

Biography

Tsuyuguchi was born in Tokyo and raised in Ehime. He attended Ehime University, but withdrew before completing his degree and joined the Haiyuza Theatre Company in 1955. His career as a screen actor started in 1959.

He came to prominence playing the thief in Shohei Imamura's Unholy Desire. He became one of Imamura's favorite actors, appearing in four of Imamura's other films (he also appeared in the stage play "Paragy Kamigami to Butabuta" directed by Imamura in 1962), including Eijanaika in 1981. But he declined Imamura's offer for him to play the role of Taro in Warm Water Under a Red Bridge (2001). He won White Bronze Award for his roles in Woman of the Lake and Yojōhan monogatari: Shōfu shino in 1966.

He appeared in many jidaigeki television dramas, in his early career he sometimes played villain roles. His most prominent roles in jidaigeki being Hyōgo Furukawa in the first season of Mito Kōmon and Fujiwara no Hidesato in the taiga drama Kaze to Kumo to Niji to. In Kaze to Kumo to Niji to, Tsuyuguchi played an important role that killed leading character Taira no Masakado in the final episode. Screenwriter Kōki Mitani quoted a Tsuyuguchi's line in Kaze to Kumo to Niji to in 2016 Taiga drama Sanada Maru because Mitani is big fan of Tsuyuguchi.

In 1981, he played a leading role for the first time in TV drama series  in Fubo no Gosan .

He is best known for his part in Taiyo ni Hoero!, one of the most famous dramas in Japanese television history. In  Taiyo ni Hoero!,  he played detective Yammura ("Yama san") for 14 years and won great popularity. Detective Yamamura who he played was killed while on duty in the episode 691 "Saraba Yamamura Keiji !（Good bye detective Yamamura)". His first photo book "Tsuyuguchi Shigeru in Taiyo ni Hoero!"(Tsuyuguchi's photos from Taiyo ni Hoero!)was released from NTV.

From the late 1980s to the mid 1990s Tsuyuguchi appeared a lot of two-hour special dramas and played lead role. Tsuyuguchi played lead role in Morimura Seiichi no  Shūchakueki Series 1–4 (directed by Kazuo Ikehiro), it is relatively famous in Japan. His final appearance as an actor is Morimura Seiichi no  Shūchakueki Series 4 (Ao no Jūjika) which was broadcast on TV Asahi in 1994.

He also portrayed the voice of the "Baron Humbert von Gikkingen" in the original Japanese version of the Studio Ghibli anime film Whisper of the Heart in 1995. 

He stopped acting in the mid 1990s and announced his retirement in 2013.

Selected filmography

Films

Television

Dubbing
Doppelgänger (1972 TV Asahi edition) – Colonel Glenn Ross (Roy Thinnes)
The Pirates of Bubuan (1972 directed by Shohei Imamura)
The Invaders – David Vincent (Roy Thinnes)
[[Sherlock Holmes (1984 TV series)|Sherlock Holmes]] (1989–94) – Sherlock Holmes (Jeremy Brett)

References

External links

NHK Archives Actor Shigeru Tsuyuguchi 露口茂

1932 births
Japanese male actors
Living people
People from Tokyo